The Harringay Canaries were a motorcycle speedway team who raced at the Harringay Stadium from 1929 until 1931 in the Southern League.

History
The Canaries were the first of three speedway teams to be based at Harringay. In their inaugural season the Canaries finished 8th in the 1929 Speedway Southern League. The following season they slipped to 12th place in the 1930 Speedway Southern League. In 1931, they resigned during the season, with their fixtures being taken over by Belle Vue Aces.

From 1934 to 1939 the team returned as the Harringay Tigers but racing ceased because of World War II. The stadium reopened on 4 April 1947 at which point the team were revived as the Harringay Racers.

Notable riders

Season summary

+ resigned and fixtures taken over by Belle Vue Aces.

References

Defunct British speedway teams
Speedway teams in London